Thomas Marshall House may refer to:

Thomas R. Marshall House, Columbia City, Indiana, listed on the National Register of Historic Places
Thomas Marshall House (Dayton, Pennsylvania), listed on the NRHP

See also
Marshall House (disambiguation)